Five Points Mall, formerly North Park Mall, was an enclosed shopping mall in Marion, Indiana, U.S. Opened in 1978, the mall's anchor stores are Roses Discount Store. Planet fitness & Applebee's are other major tenants. There are 3 vacant anchor stores that were once Sears, Carson's, and JCPenney. Outparcel properties include Subway, Buffalo Wild Wings, Ruler Foods, Jo-Ann Stores, and Dollar Tree. The Mall is managed by Select Strategies.

History

Five Points Mall opened in 1978 as North Park Mall. Its original anchor stores were JCPenney, Hills (became Ames in 1998, then Steve & Barry's in 2004, now Roses). and Meis (later Elder-Beerman, and finally Carson's in 2011. Carson's Closed in 2018). Sears was later added in 1990. The movie theater, also an original tenant, closed in the late 1990s, It was Split into an Arcade and a Hibbett Sports. Other early tenants included a Standard Supermarket then Hank’s Supermarket (which later became part of Lance's New Market, later Rulers) In 2013, the Sears closed as a result of low sales of the 2011 holiday season, Sears Closed at the End of 2013 On January 15, 2014, JCPenney announced it was closing their Five Points location, despite still having a lease on the space until 2017.  On January 31, 2018, The Bon-Ton announced that the Carson's location would be closing. The store closed April 29, 2018, Carson’s was the only Original Tenant from the Malls Opening. In early 2019 Most of the mall was boarded off, the only part that was open is by the former Carson's. An Applebee's remains open and had access to the remaining mall space. Roses and Planet Fitness (which opened in 2018 with exterior entrances only, and taking space formerly occupied by vacant storefronts including KB Toys, Hallmark, and Finish line) also are open but cannot access the mall. In late 2019 the malls interior fully closed. Leaving no stores left except Roses, Applebee’s, and Planet Fitness.

Anchors

Current
Roses Discount Store

Former
Ames (store) (opened 1978 as Hills Department Store, converted to Ames in 1998, closed 2002; renovated and reopened as Steve & Barry's in 2004 - currently occupied by Roses) 
JCPenney (1978-2014) 
Sears (1990-2013) 
Carson's  Opened as Meis (department store) Sold to Elder-Beerman in 1989, Converted to Carson's in 2011, Closed in 2018 with the Entire chain’s bankruptcy.  (1978-2018)

References

External links
Five Points Mall

Buildings and structures in Grant County, Indiana
Marion, Indiana
Defunct shopping malls in the United States
Shopping malls in Indiana
Shopping malls established in 1978
Tourist attractions in Grant County, Indiana
1978 establishments in Indiana
Shopping malls disestablished in 2019